Following is a list of Bangladeshi poets, either born in Bangladesh or who published much of their writing while living in the country.

A
Ahsan Habib
Abul Hussain
Abu Zafar Obaidullah
Abu Hena Mustafa Kamal
Al Mahmud
Abul Hasan
Arunabh Sarkar
Abid Azad
Alaol
Azizur Rahman (poet)
Anisul Hoque
Anwar Pasha
Abdul Mannan Syed
Abu Hasan Shahriar
Abdul Hye Sikder
 Abid Anwar
Abdul Ghani Hazari

B
Bimal Guha
Bonde Ali Mia

E
Enamul Karim Nirjhar

F
Farrukh Ahmed
Fazal Shahabuddin

H
Helal Hafiz
Hasan Hafizur Rahman
Humayun Azad

J
Jasimuddin
Jibanananda Das

K
Kazi Nazrul Islam
Khondakar Ashraf Hossain
Kusumkumari Das
Hafiz Rashid Khan
Kaykobad

L
Lalon Shah

M
Michael Madhusudan Dutt
Mozid Mahmud
Motiur Rahman Mollik

N
Nirmalendu Goon

R
Rudra Mohammad Shahidullah

S
Shah Muhammad Sagir
Shamsur Rahman
Syed Shamsul Huq
Shaheed Quaderi
Sikdar Aminul Haq
Shah Abdul Karim

T
 Tuhin Das

See also
 List of Bangladeshi people

References

Bangladeshi
poets